The national museums of Thailand are operated by the Fine Arts Department of the Ministry of Culture, and are responsible for the safeguarding of state-owned historical and cultural artefacts. In 1926 King Prajadhipok created the Royal Institute of Art, Literature and Archaeology, which then opened the museum in Bangkok at the Wang Na palace. Today there are 43 national museum branches operated across the country.

List of museums

Central

 Bangkok National Museum (Bangkok)
 Kanchanaphisek National Museum (Pathum Thani)
 National Museum of Royal Barges (Bangkok)
 Royal Elephant National Museum (Bangkok)
 Benchamabopit National Museum (Bangkok)
 The National Gallery (Bangkok)
 Silpa Bhirasri National Museum (Bangkok)
 Chao Samphraya National Museum (Ayutthaya)
 Chantharakasem National Museum (Ayutthaya)
 Narai National Museum (Lopburi)
 Inburi National Museum (Singburi)
 Chainatmuni National Museum (Chai Nat)
 Uthong National Museum (Suphanburi)
 Suphanburi National Museum (Suphanburi)
 Phra Pathommachedi National Museum (Nakhon Pathom)
 Phra Nakhon Khiri National Museum (Phetchaburi)
 Bankao National Museum (Kanchanaburi)
 Ratchaburi National Museum (Ratchaburi)
 Thai Rice Farmers National Museum (Suphanburi)
 Prachinburi National Museum (Prachinburi)
 National Maritime Museum (Chanthaburi)

North

 Ramkhamhaeng National Museum (Sukhothai)
 Sawanworanayok National Museum (Sukhothai)
 Kamphaeng Phet National Museum (Kamphaeng Phet)
 Phra Phutthachinnarat National Museum (Phitsanulok)
 Chiang Mai National Museum (Chiang Mai)
 Chiang Saen National Museum (Chiang Rai)
 Hariphunchai National Museum (Lamphun)
 Nan National Museum (Nan)

Northeast

 Phimai National Museum (Nakhon Ratchasima)
 Mahaviravong National Museum (Nakhon Ratchasima)
 Roi-Et National Museum (Roi Et)
 Surin National Museum (Surin)
 Ubon Ratchathani National Museum (Ubon Ratchathani)
 Khon Kaen National Museum (Khon Kaen)
 Ban Chiang National Museum (Udon Thani)

South

 Nakhon Si Thammarat National Museum (Nakhon Si Thammarat)
 Chaiya National Museum (Chaiya, Surat Thani)
 Thalang National Museum (Phuket)
 Songkhla National Museum (Songkhla)
 Muchimavas National Museum (Songkhla)
 Chumphon National Museum (Chumphon)
 Satun National Museum (Satun)

 
Fine Arts Department (Thailand)